Tian Yuan (born 30 March 1985) is a Chinese singer-songwriter, actress, novelist and photographer. Born in Wuhan, China, she majored in English at Beijing Language and Culture University, and graduated in 2007.

Music career
At age of only 16, she joined local band Hopscotch as vocal and lyricist. The band was signed under to major label Modern Sky in 2002, and released their first English-language album that year, titled A Wishful Way. The album was influenced by trip hop and indie rock, and well received by some critics and general public in China due to its fresh sound. Tian Yuan's singing career paused temporarily when a contract dispute occurred between her and Modern Sky. Tian Yuan is now recording her first solo album under a new label, Dong Music.
Her 11-song solo album Tian Yuan was released in 2010.

Writing career
In 2002, Tian released her English-language novel, Zebra Woods, which received some international acclaim, and wrote a collection of short stories while touring for A Wishful Way, which was later published in China. In May 2007, Tian Yuan released her second novel Double Mono, a novel about love, youth and self-discovery.

Acting career
Tian's acting debut was in the 2004 Hong Kong film Butterfly, which she starred as a lesbian singer, alongside Josie Ho. Her performance won an award as the Best New Performer at the 24th Hong Kong Film Award and Taiwan's Golden Horse Film Awards.

Filmography

Films

Short films

Music videos

Notes

External links
Tian Yuan's Chinese Blog
Tian Yuan's flickr
Tian Yuan's myspace
Tian Yuan's official website at Dong Music (will be available after the new album's release)
Tian Yuan pinkwork interview

Tian Yuan's Douban musician page

1985 births
Living people
Chinese guitarists
Chinese women singer-songwriters
Actresses from Wuhan
Singers from Hubei
Chinese women photographers
Artists from Wuhan
Musicians from Wuhan
Writers from Wuhan
20th-century Chinese women writers
21st-century Chinese women writers
21st-century Chinese actresses
Chinese film actresses
Chinese women novelists
21st-century Chinese women singers
21st-century guitarists
21st-century women photographers
21st-century women guitarists